Mumpf railway station is a railway station in the municipality of Mumpf, in the Swiss canton of Aargau. It is an intermediate stop on the Bözberg line and is served by local trains only.

Services 
Mumpf is served by the S1 the Basel S-Bahn:

 : half-hourly service from Basel SBB to Frick or Laufenburg.

References

External links 
 
 

Railway stations in the canton of Aargau
Swiss Federal Railways stations